Howard Ralph Nunn (October 18, 1935 – February 17, 2012) was an American professional baseball player. The right-handed pitcher appeared in Major League Baseball for the full 1961 season (although he was sidelined by a sore arm for part of the campaign), along with partial seasons in 1959 and 1962. Nunn was nicknamed "Perry" by his teammates due to his pleasant singing voice.

Nunn entered baseball in 1954 after signing with the St. Louis Cardinals, and was very successful at the minor league level. He compiled a 112–58 won/lost record in nine minor league seasons, including a 23–7 season in the Class C California League, an 18-win year in the Class D Appalachian League, and a 16-victory campaign in the Double-A Texas League. In 1960, he posted a 1.99 earned run average in the Triple-A International League and overall had a career minor-league ERA of 3.38 in 1,463 innings pitched.

As a Major Leaguer, Nunn won four of seven decisions in 46 games pitched, all in relief, with an ERA of 5.11. In 68 innings pitched, he allowed 73 hits and 42 bases on balls, striking out 50.

He was a teammate (and, briefly, roommate) of Jim Brosnan on the 1959 Cardinals and 1961 Cincinnati Reds, and appears in Brosnan's memoirs The Long Season and Pennant Race. Nunn worked in 24 games for the National League champion Reds in 1961, but did not appear in the World Series.  He spent spring training with the 1962 New York Mets — the inaugural season for that expansion team — but was returned to the Reds' organization before the regular season began.

References

External links
 or Venezuelan Baseball League statistics
Retrosheet

1935 births
2012 deaths
Baseball players from Winston-Salem, North Carolina
Cincinnati Reds players
Fresno Cardinals players
Havana Sugar Kings players
Houston Buffaloes players
Industriales de Valencia players
Jersey City Jerseys players
Johnson City Cardinals players
Macon Peaches players
Major League Baseball pitchers
People from Surry County, North Carolina
Rochester Red Wings players
St. Louis Cardinals players
San Diego Padres (minor league) players
American expatriate baseball players in Cuba